The Hatillo Eagles was a semi-pro Puerto Rican football team based in Hatillo, Puerto Rico, competing in the Puerto Rico American Football League (PRAFL).

History

Club Culture

Hatillo Eagles

AFAPR Sub-23
It is the club's U-23 team that participates in the American Football League of Puerto Rico 2nd division of Puerto Rican American football league pyramid, its goal is to develop players with potential so that they can eventually make the jump to either the PRAFL team.

References

Puerto Rico American Football League teams
Hatillo, Puerto Rico